Saryazd (also Romanized as Sar-e Yazd and Sar-i-Yezd; also known as Mehriz) is a village in Khvormiz Rural District, in the Central District of Mehriz County, Yazd Province, Iran. At the 2006 census, its population was 421, in 141 families. The village's name means 'head of Yazd' in Persian.

Historical Significance
The town was the final stopping point on the silk road route on the way to Yazd, hence its name in Persian 'head of Yazd'. The town has several sites of significance: Sar Yazd Fortress, a reservoir, a caravansary dating from the Safavid era and another caravansary dating from Seljuk times.

References 

Populated places in Mehriz County